Robin Söderling successfully defended his title, by defeating Jo-Wilfried Tsonga, 6–3, 3–6, 6–3, in the final.

Seeds

  Robin Söderling (champion)
  Andy Murray (first round)
  David Ferrer (first round)
  Tomáš Berdych (quarterfinals, withdrew because of illness)
  Jürgen Melzer (second round)
  Mikhail Youzhny (quarterfinals)
  Ivan Ljubičić (semifinals)
  Jo-Wilfried Tsonga (final)

Qualifying

Draw

Finals

Top half

Bottom half

External links
 Main draw
 Qualifying draw

Singles
2011 ATP World Tour